The Swedish Army Service Troops (T or Underhållstrupperna, before 1942 called Trängen) is the military logistics (or train) branch of the Swedish Army. The task of the troops is to train personnel for maintenance units, provide supplies, repair damaged equipment, retract and care for sick personnel as well as in the event of war mobilizing them. The troops are today fully motorized.

History

In 1885, the first army service unit was established, the Logistic Battalion (Trängbataljonen) in Marieberg, Stockholm. It was divided into the Svea Logistic Battalion (T 1) and the Göta Logistic Battalion (T 2) in 1891, the latter being placed in Karlsborg. According to the Defence Act of 1892, two new logistic battalions, Norrland Logistic Battalion (T 3) in Sollefteå and Wendes Logistic Battalion (T 4) in Landskrona were established. Through the Defence Act of 1901, two further logistic units (now called corps) were established, so that there would be one logistic unit for each army division. These were the 2nd Svea Logistic Corps (T 5) and 2nd Göta Logistic Corps (T 6), which were placed in Sala (1906), and in Linköping (1911) respectively. They changed names in 1904 to Västmanland Logistic Corps (T 5), and Östgöta Logistic Corps (T 6). Meanwhile, Wendes Logistic Corps changed name to Scanian Logistic Corps. In 1905, Göta Logistic Corps moved to Skövde and in 1907 Svea Logistic Corps moved to Örebro and Scanian Logistic Corps moved to Hässleholm.

In the Defence Act of 1914, an inspector (colonel) became the highest guardian of the army service corps. By now it occupied 87 officers plus 6 regimental physicians and 6 battalion physicians, 6 battalion veterinarians and regimental pastors. According to the Defence Act of 1925, Västmanland and Östgöta Logistic Corps were disbanded, while Svea Logistic Corps was placed in Linköping. The Swedish Army Service Troops now consisted of the Inspector of the Swedish Army Service Troops with staff as well as four corps'. In each corps, a train, an automobile and a medical company were organized. In the Defence Act of 1942, the Swedish Army Service Troops were significantly expanded and an independent logistic company was established in Nora (T 2 N), disbanded in 1952. After the independent commissariat and ordnance companies were transferred to the army service troops, the corps became regiments (1949). In 1954 there were Svea Logistic Regiment (T 1) in Linköping, Göta Logistic Regiment (T 2) in Skövde, Norrland Logistic Regiment (T 3) in Sollefteå and Scanian Logistic Regiment (T 4) in Hässleholm. Officers where trained at the Swedish Army Service Troops Cadet School (Trängtruppernas kadettskola, TrängKS) 1942–1961, the Swedish Army Service Troops Cadet and Officer Candidate School (Trängtruppernas kadett- och aspirantskola, TrängKAS) 1961–1981, the Swedish Army Service Troops Officers College (Trängtruppernas officershögskola, TrängOHS) 1981–1991 and the Swedish Army Maintenance Center (Arméns underhållscentrum, UhC) 1991–1997.

Since 2004, the only remaining unit of the Swedish Army Service Troops is the Logistic Regiment (TrängR) in Skövde. It consists, among other units, of the 1st and the 2nd Logistics Battalions, which has the tasks of supplying materiel such as fuel, ammunition, food, water and other equipment to the units of the Swedish Armed Forces. The battalions are organized with one battalion staff, one command company and three logistics companies. In peacetime, the battalions has one medical reinforcement company each.

Uniforms

Miscellaneous
In 1885 the first uniform of the new army branch was approved. The model was based on the dragoon uniform. The tunic was of dark blue broadcloth, double-buttoned with shoulder straps and medium blue facing fastened with seven silver-coloured buttons of corps model on each side and medium blue piping along the bottom edge. The Prussian collar and cuffs were medium blue and decorated with two white buttonholes. The long trousers and the riding breeches were of dark blue broadcloth and had medium blue piping on the outer seams. Officers had silver-coloured epaulettes with medium blue lining. Headgear was a dark blue cap m/1865 of infantry model or a casque of black leather with plate and chinstrap of silver-plated metal. On parade the point could be exchanged for a drooping plume of black horsehair. A belt of brown leather or, for officers, a blue and yellow sash were worn when needed. For footgear, black boots or riding boots with spurs.

In 1895 a dark blue single-buttoned tunic with medium blue collar and piping along the front and lower edge and on the rear pockets. A white buttonhole with a button on each cuff. Cap m/1865 was replaced by cap m/1886. The casque was kept but from 1895 was called helmet. In 1900 a stable jacket of dark blue broadcloth was introduced for officers and NCOs.

Arms and strappings
The officer's sabre m/1891 was replaced by sabre m/1872 for all personnel. Hand-held firearms were carbine m/1870 and m/1894 while officers had revolver m/1871 and m/1887.

Inspector of the Swedish Army Service Troops
The head was called Inspector of the Swedish Army Service Troops (Tränginspektören, Trinsp). The Inspector, who also has regimental commander's power and authority of the branch's officers and non-commissioned officers with similarities, had the rank of colonel. In his capacity as branch inspector, and regarding the training of the army service troops, he had the same duties and responsibilities as other inspectors. The Inspector was assisted by a staff, the Army Service Troops Inspectorate (Tränginspektionen). The Inspector was from 1991 to 1997 the head of the Swedish Army Maintenance Center (Arméns underhållscentrum, UhC).

1887–1888: Hemming Gadd (acting)
1888–1889: Emil Adolf Malmborg (acting)
1889–1892: Ernst von der Lancken
1892–1896: Gustaf Anton Bråkenhielm
1896–1903: Malcolm Hamilton
1903–1906: Carl Wilhelm Ericson
1906–1915: ?
1915–1915: Gustaf Uggla (acting)
1916–1926: John Améen
1927–1931: Eric Virgin
1931–1933: Olof Thörnell
1933–1942: Axel Bredberg
1942–1946: Ivar Gewert
1946–1949: Gottfrid Björck
1949–1956: Knut Hagberg
1956–1960: Adolf Norberg
1960–1965: Birger Hasselrot
1965–1972: Magnus Bruzelius
1972–1974: Dag Nordenskiöld
1974–1983: Börje Wallberg
1983–1987: Curt Sjöö
1987–1991: Claes Tamm
1991–1993: Ragnar Söderberg
1993–1997: Lars Nordmark

See also
Swedish Armoured Troops
Swedish Engineer Troops
Swedish Army Signal Troops
List of Swedish logistic regiments

Footnotes

References

Notes

Print

Further reading

Military units and formations of the Swedish Army
Military logistics units and formations of Sweden
1885 establishments in Sweden
Military units and formations established in 1885